Úlfur Úlfur is an Icelandic hip-hop duo which consists of singers Arnar Freyr Frostason and Helgi Sæmundur Guðmundsson. Their first album, Föstudagurinn langi came out in 2011 and their second, Tvær plánetur, came out in 2015. In 2017, it published their third album, named Hefnið okkar (English: Revenge us).

Discography
2011: Föstudagurinn langi
2015: Tvær plánetur
2017: Hefnið okkar

Singles
2015: Brennum Allt
2015: Tarantúlur
2015: 100.000
2016: Barn
2017: Bróðir

References

Icelandic hip hop groups